Ogun State is a state in southwestern Nigeria. Created on 3 February 1976 from the former Western State. Ogun State borders Lagos State to the south, Oyo State and Osun State to the north, Ondo State to the east, and the Republic of Benin to the west. Abeokuta is both Ogun State's capital and most populous city; other important cities in the state include Ijebu Ode, the  royal capital of the Ijebu Kingdom, and Sagamu, Nigeria's leading kola nut grower. Ogun state is covered predominantly by rain forest and has wooden savanna in the northwest . Ogun State had a total population of 3,751,140 residents as of 2006, making Ogun State the 16th most populated state in Nigeria In terms of landmass, Ogun State is the 24th largest State in Nigeria with land area of 16,762 kilometer square.

Nicknamed the "Gateway to Nigeria", the state is notable for having a high concentration of industrial Estates and being a major manufacturing hub in Nigeria. Major factories in Ogun include the Dangote Cement factory in Ibese, Nestle, Lafarge Cement factory in Ewekoro, Memmcol in Orimerunmu, Coleman Cables in Sagamu and Arepo, Procter & Gamble in Agbara, amongst others.

Ogun State is predominantly Yoruba, with the Yoruba language serving as the lingua franca of the state. The dominant religions in Ogun State are Islam and Christianity although a certain amount of traditional religion is still practiced. Ogun State is noted for being the almost exclusive site of Ofada rice production. Ogun is also home to many icons in Nigeria in particular and Africa in general.

Governor 
The current governor is Dapo Abiodun, A member of the All Progressives Congress, who heads the Executive Council of Ogun State. On Wednesday May 29, 2019, Abiodun was sworn in as the fifth governor of Ogun State at the MKO Abiola Stadium in Kuto, Abeokuta.

Local government areas

Politics 
The State government is led by a democratically elected governor who works closely with members of the state's house of assembly. The capital city of the state is Abeokuta.

Electoral system

The governor of the state is selected using a modified two-round system. To be elected in the first round, a candidate must receive the plurality of the vote and over 25% of the vote in at least two -third of the State local government Areas. If no candidate passes threshold, a second round will be held between the top candidate and the next candidate to have received a plurality of votes in the highest number of local government Areas.

Ogun State consists of twenty local government areas. They are:

 Abeokuta North Akọmọjẹ
 Abeokuta South Ake
 Ado-Odo/Ota Ọ̀tà
 Ewekoro Itori
 Ifo Ifo
 Ijebu East Ọ̀gbẹ̀rẹ̀
 Ijebu North Ìjẹ̀bú Igbó
 Ijebu North East Atan
 Ijebu Ode Ìjẹ̀bú-Òde
 Ikenne Ìkẹ́nnẹ́
 Imeko Afon Imẹkọ
 Ipokia Ipokia
 Obafemi Owode Owódé-Ẹ̀gbá
 Odogbolu Odògbólú
 Odeda Odẹda
 Ogun Waterside Abigi
 Remo North Ìṣarà-Rẹ́mọ
 Sagamu(Shagamu) Ṣàgámù
 Yewa North(formerly Egbado North) Ayetoro
 Yewa South(formerly Egbado South) Ilaro

The main ethnic groups in Ogun State are the Ẹgba, Ijebu, Remo, Egbado, Awori and the Egun peoples.There are also sub groups like the Ikale, the Ketu, the Ohori and the Anago

Ogun State is divided into three senatorial districts: Ogun Central, Ogun East and Ogun West.

Ogun Central consists mostly of the Egbas that occupies six local governments: Abeokuta North (Akomoje), Abeokuta south (Ake), Ewekoro (Itori), Ifo (Ifo), Obafemi owode (Owode ẹgba) and Odeda (Odeda).

Ogun East consists mostly of the Ijebus and the Remos that occupies 9 local governments: Ijebu East (Ogbẹrẹ), Ijebu North (Ijebu Igbo), Ijebu North East (Attan), Ijebu ode (Ijebu ode), Ikenne (Ikenne remo), Odogbolu (Odogbolu), Ogun waterside (Abigi), Remo North (Ilisan Remo) and Sagamu (Sagamu).

Ogun West consists mostly of the Yewas (formerly Egbados) that occupies 5 local governments: Ado odo Ota (Otta), Imeko Afon (Imeko), Ipokia (Ipokia), Yewa North (Ayetoro) and Yewa South (Ilaro).

Educational facilities
Ogun state has three federal secondary schools; Federal Government Girls' College, Sagamu  and Federal Government College, Odogbolu and Federal Science and Technical College, Ijebu-Imushin.

Ogun state has one Federal University; the Federal University of Agriculture, Abeokuta (FUNAAB) and one Federal college of education, FCE Osiele (both at Odeda Local government area), one state government college of education, named after the late Nigerian educationist of international repute Augustus Taiwo Solarin in 1994 as Tai Solarin College of Education (TASCE), (formerly known as Ogun State College of Education, Ijagun, Ijebu-Ode, one Federal Polytechnic, Ilaro). One is named after late Nigerian business mogul and winner of June 12, 1993 election, Basorun Moshood Kasimawo Olawale Abiola as Moshood Abiola Polytechnic (MAPOLY), formerly known as Ogun State Polytechnic, Ojere, Abeokuta, Another Gateway Polytechnic Saapade, Remo (GAPOSA), Abraham Adesanya Polytechnic Ijebu-Igbo (Aapoly) (formerly known as 'The Polytechnic Ijebu-Igbo) it was name after Chief Abraham Aderibigbe Adesanya who was a Nigerian politician, lawyer and activist.

Two state government universities: Olabisi Onabanjo University, Ago Iwoye (formerly known as Ogun State University), and the Tai Solarin University of Education (TASUED) Ijebu Ode.

Ogun State has a total of nine registered universities, the highest of any state in Nigeria. It has five private universities. Amongst others are Chrisland University, Abeokuta Bells University of Technology in Ota,  Covenant University and Babcock University in Ilisan-Remo, which was the first private university in the country.

The state has two major government hospitals: the Federal Medical Center at Abeokuta, and the Olabisi Onabanjo University Teaching Hospital in Sagamu. The National Youth Service Corps (NYSC) Permanent Orientation Camp is located at Sagamu Local Government area of the state.

Ogun state Government has  begin the itele road today

Tertiary institutions

Babcock University, Ilisan Remo
 Bells University of Technology, Ota
 Chrisland University, Abeokuta 
 Christopher University, Lagos Ibadan ExpresWay Makun, Sagamu
 Covenant University, Ota  
 Crawford University, Igbesa
 Crescent University, Abeokuta
 Federal Polytechnic, Ilaro
 Federal University of Agriculture, Abeokuta
Hallmark University, Ijebu Itele
 McPherson University, Seriki-Sotayo 
 Moshood Abiola Polytechnic, Ojere
 Mountain Top University, Lagos-Ibadan Expressway
 National Open University of Nigeria, Kobape, Abeokuta
 Ogun State College of Health Technology, Ilese, Ijebu Ode
 Olabisi Onabanjo University, Ago Iwoye
 Tai Solarin University of Education, Ijagun, Ijebu-Ode

Think tanks
African Centre for Development and Strategic Studies (ACDESS)

Notable religious places

 The Bilikisu Sungbo Shrine, Oke-Eiri, near Ijebu-Ode. It was declared a part of the national heritage in 1964, and is believed by the Ijebus to be the burial place of the fabled  Queen of Sheba. It serves as a place of pilgrimage for Yoruba traditionalists, Yoruba Muslims and Yoruba Christians alike.
 The Church of the Lord (Aladura), Ogere Remo
 Redemption Camp (Lagos Ibadan Express Road)
 Living Faith Church Worldwide, (Canaanland, Km. 10, Idiroko Road, Ota, Ogun State, Nigeria)

Notable people

Abraham Adesanya (1922–2008), politician
Adebayo Adedeji (1930–2018), economist
Adebayo Ogunlesi (b. 1953), lawyer, investment banker
Adegboyega Dosunmu Amororo II, film producer, Olowu of Owu kingdom
Adewale Oke Adekola
Afolabi Olabimtan
Anthony Joshua
Babafemi Ogundipe
Babatunde Osotimehin
Bisi Onasanya
Bola Ajibola
Bola Kuforiji Olubi
Bosun Tijani (b. 1977), Entrepreneur 
Olu Oyesanya
Cornelius Taiwo
Dapo Abiodun
David Alaba, son of George Alaba, a prince of Ogere Remo
Dimeji Bankole
Ebenezer Obey, jùjú musician
Ernest Shonekan
Fela Kuti (1938–1997), multi-instrumentalist, bandleader, composer, political activist, Pan-Africanist
Fireboy DML, singer
Femi Okurounmu, politician
Fola Adeola, businessman, politician
Funmilayo Ransome-Kuti (1900–1978), educator, women's rights activist
Funke Akindele (b. 1977), Actress
Gbenga Daniel (b. 1956), politician
Hannah Idowu Dideolu Awolowo (1915–2015), businesswoman and politician
Hubert Ogunde (1916–1990), actor, playwright, theatre manager and musician
Ibikunle Amosun (b. 1958), politician, senator, Governor of Ogun State in 2011–2019
Idowu Sofola (1934–1982), jurist, President of the Nigerian Bar Association in 1980–1982
Joseph Adenuga (b. 1982), aka Skepta, British musician and record producer
Jubril Martins-Kuye (b. 1942), politician
K1 De Ultimate (b. 1957), Fuji musician
Kehinde Sofola (1924–2007), jurist
Kemi Adeosun (b. 1967), former Finance Minister of Nigeria
Laycon (b. 1993), professional name of Olamilekan Moshood Agbeleshe, reality TV personality, rapper, singer and songwriter
Mike Adenuga
Moshood Abiola
Oba Otudeko (b. 1943), businessman
Obafemi Awolowo (1909–1987)
Ola Rotimi
Olabisi Onabanjo
Oladipo Diya
Olamide
Olawunmi Banjo
Olusegun Obasanjo
Olusegun Osoba
Paul Adefarasin
Peter Akinola
Salawa Abeni
Sara Forbes Bonetta
Tai Solarin (1922–1994), educator, author, civil rights activist
Thomas Adeoye Lambo (1923–2004), scholar, administrator, psychiatrist, Deputy Director General of the World Health Organization
Tunde Bakare (b. 1954), Prophetic-Apostolic Pastor, politician
Tunji Olurin (b. 1944), retired general
Wole Soyinka (b. 1934), 1986 The Nobel Prize for Literature laureate
Yemi Osinbajo (b. 1957), politician, lawyer

Tourist centers in Ogun state 
 Olumo Rock
 Olusegun Obasanjo Presidential Library

Major rivers 
 Ogun River
 Yewa River

Mineral resources in Ogun State
The following are the mineral resources in Ogun State:
Clay
Limestone and Phosphate
Bitumen
Kaolin
Gemstone
Feldspar

References

External links
 
 Ogun State Government Homepage
 Portal of Educational Institutions in Ogun State
 Federal Government College, Odogbolu
Abraham Adesanya Polytechnic, Ijebu-Igbo,https://aapoly.edu.ng/
 Mercyland International Schools Homepage
Gateway Polytechnic, Saapade, Remo https://gaposa.edu.ng
List of NBTE approved State government owned Polytechnics in Nigeria https://net.nbte.gov.ng/state%20polytechnics

 
States in Yorubaland
States of Nigeria
States and territories established in 1976
1976 establishments in Nigeria